Martin Richard Durkin is an English television producer and director who has been commissioned by  Britain's Channel 4. 

He has produced, directed and executive-produced programmes covering the arts, science, history, entertainment, features and social documentaries. He is a libertarian and was formerly connected to the now defunct Revolutionary Communist Party, and a number of his documentaries have caused controversies, including those critical of state spending  and environmentalism. He has been described as "the scourge of the greens" and "one of the environmentalists' favourite hate figures".

Documentaries

Against Nature
In 1997, Channel 4 broadcast Durkin's documentary series Against Nature, which attacked the environmental movement as being a threat to personal freedom and for crippling economic development.

The UK's then broadcasting regulator the Independent Television Commission received 151 complaints from viewers and interviewees featured in the programme with four complaints upheld. In its report on the series, the ITC rejected 147 complaints that mainly were concerned with fairness and misrepresentation, stating that "the programmes' line that green ideologies were, at least in some respects, open to criticism on both scientific and humanitarian grounds, was a legitimate approach". It stated that environmentalists had been permitted a fair chance to air their side of the story in the televised debates that followed the broadcast.

The ITC stated that four complaints were upheld because: "the programmes breached the Programme Code in respect of the failure to make the four interviewees adequately aware of the nature of the programmes, and the way their contributions were edited." For these reasons, Channel 4 later issued a public apology on prime time television. According to The Independent, Durkin "accepts the charge of misleading contributors, but describes the verdict of distortion as 'complete tosh'".

Equinox

Durkin produced 2 documentaries for Channel 4's science strand Equinox. In 1998 he produced "Storm in a D-Cup", which argued that the medical dangers of silicone breast implants had been exaggerated for political reasons and highlighting evidence that implants may even carry medical benefits. In 2000 he produced The Rise and Fall of GM defending the science of genetic modification.

The 1998 documentary on breast implants was originally developed for the BBC but was eventually produced for Channel 4 after the BBC declined to commission it; the BBC's in-house researcher concluded that Durkin had ignored evidence contradicting his claims in the programme. Environmental activist and writer George Monbiot wrote "Neither Martin Durkin nor, extraordinarily, Charles Furneaux, the commissioning editor of the science series Equinox, has a science background.  They don't need one, for science on Channel 4 has been reduced to a crude manifesto for corporate libertarianism."  The film later won awards from the British Medical Association and the American Society for Plastic Surgeons.

The Rise and Fall of GM
This documentary, which argues in favour of genetic modification, was broadcast on Channel 4 on 20 March 2000, also met with complaints. Environmentalist activists organised a campaign in an effort to discredit the film. A joint letter signed by a number of scientists from the Third World  was issued in protest of Durkin's claims in this documentary. Mae-Wan Ho, a scientist featured on the programme, later said of her participation in the programme: "I feel completely betrayed and misled. They did not tell me it was going to be an attack on my position." However, although broadcasting regulator Ofcom received 17 complaints about the programme none was upheld; Ofcom concluded that 'although the programme set out to be a critical analysis of the case against GM, it nevertheless gave opportunity for a number of anti-GM speakers to explain their views clearly and fairly.' Ofcom review of complaints against Martin Durkin, ofcom.org.uk; accessed 20 December 2015.

The Great Global Warming Swindle

The Great Global Warming Swindle was a 2007 documentary film promoting climate change denial that premiered on Channel 4 in the United Kingdom on March 8, 2007 and was subsequently criticised heavily by scientists. The film features scientists and others who oppose the scientific consensus that global warming is caused by human activity. The second part of the programme examines the conditions under which one of the current theories was developed. It alleges political pressures on those who do reject anthropogenic causes of global warming, speculates on reasons for the wide adoption of this consensus and on factors leading to its original development. The film also interviews deniers who view environmental policies as holding back developing nations from industrialising.
The film has drawn widespread complaints  from some in the scientific community, citing numerous errors and misleading claims.

Carl Wunsch who appeared on the programme has since repudiated the film, and described it "as close to propaganda as anything since World War II". Durkin responded that Wunsch had been told very explicitly the nature of the programme and now appeared to be back-tracking.

The film was praised by opponents of the scientific consensus on global warming, including Andrew Bolt, Dominic Lawson and Steven Milloy, and Durkin's work has been defended in an interview in Spiked.

It later emerged that Durkin had fallen out with geneticist Armand Leroi (with whom Durkin had previously refused to work), after Leroi questioned the accuracy of the data used in the film in an email to Durkin. Leroi copied the e-mail to various colleagues including Guardian journalist and Bad Science columnist Ben Goldacre and science writer and mathematics expert Simon Singh. Durkin replied to Leroi copying in the others with the single sentence: "You're a big daft cock." Singh then sent an email to Durkin that said: "I have not paid the same attention to your programme as Armand has done, but from what I did see it is an irresponsible piece of film-making. If you can send me a copy of the programme then I will examine it in more detail and give you a more considered response...it would be great if you could engage in the debate rather just resorting to one line replies."

Durkin responded by claiming that global warming had stopped, and concluded with, "Never mind a bit of irresponsible film-making. Go and fuck yourself." Durkin later apologised for his language, saying that he had sent the e-mails when tired and had just finished making the programme, and that he was "eager to have all the science properly debated with scientists qualified in the right areas."

The film was awarded the Best Documentary trophy at the Io Isabella film festival and was shortlisted for the Best Documentary prize in the British television industry's 2008 Broadcast Awards. An official judgement issued on 21 July 2008 by the British media regulator Ofcom found that the programme "did not fulfill obligations to be impartial and to reflect a range of views on controversial issues". It upheld complaints by Sir David King that his views had been misrepresented, and Carl Wunsch, on the points that he had been misled as to its intent, and that the impression had been given that he agreed with the programme's position on climate change. However, the regulator said that because "the link between human activity and global warming... became settled before March 2007" the audience was not "materially misled so as to cause harm or offence". Ofcom declined to rule on the accuracy of the programme, saying: "It is not within Ofcom's remit or ability in this case as the regulator of the 'communications industry' to establish or seek to adjudicate on 'facts' such as whether global warming is a man-made phenomenon".

Britain's Trillion Pound Horror Story

In 2010 Durkin made a programme called Britain's Trillion Pound Horror Story for Channel 4. Ostensibly about Britain's national debt, the film makes a case for lower taxes, a smaller public sector and a free-market economy. The film argues that Hong Kong's social and economic success is attributable to the positive non-interventionism implemented in 1961 by John James Cowperthwaite. In the film, Durkin argued that increasing public spending would stunt the economy instead of reviving it. The film featured Nigel Lawson, Geoffrey Howe, Brendan Barber and Alastair Darling.

Brexit: The Movie

In 2016 Durkin made a documentary film called Brexit: The Movie, about that year's referendum on EU membership, arguing for a vote to Leave. The film had a budget of £100,000, funded by crowdfunding.

As executive producer
Martin Durkin has executive produced a wide range of programmes.  Productions include: The Naked Pilgrim, an architectural travelogue that followed art critic Brian Sewell's pilgrimage to Santiago de Compostela; produced for UK's Channel Five it won the Sandford St. Martin Trust award for best programme in 2004; Face of Britain for Channel 4, a three-part series presented by Neil Oliver, which looked at the Wellcome Trust's DNA project profiling the ancestry of various British communities; How Do They Do It?, an engineering series for Discovery Channel; Secret Intersex, a two-part series about intersexuality for Channel 4, which was short listed for Best Science Programme in the 2004 Royal Television Society awards. He has served on the steering committees of the World Congress of Science Producers and the Edinburgh Television Festival and as a judge on the Bafta and Royal Television Society Awards.

References

External links
 
 Geoffrey Lean, "Global Warming: An inconvenient truth or hot air?", The Independent, 4 March 2007. 
 Britain's Trillion Pound Horror Story · Watch on 4OD · Play on 4OD Player
 Robin McKie, "Why Channel 4 has got it wrong over climate change", The Observer, 4 March 2007. 
 Profile of Martin Durkin on GMWatch.org Profile of Martin Durkin, GMWatch.org; accessed 20 December 2015.
 "More digs at Durkin", The Guardian, 22 March 2000. 
 Friends of the Earth press release, foe.co.uk, 2 April 1998. 
Independent Television Commission ruling on "Against Nature", ofcom.org.uk; accessed 20 December 2015.
 "Why does Channel 4 seem to be waging a war against the greens?" The Guardian, 22 July 2008.
 Brexit - The Movie web site

Living people
English television producers
British documentary film directors
1962 births